Chhote Sarkaar is a 1974 Indian Bollywood film directed by K. Shankar. It stars Shammi Kapoor, Sadhana, Shashikala, Helen in pivotal roles.

Plot
Raja and Moti are twins. While Moti is loved by everyone, Raja, who paints women, is considered a fool. When Moti's wife Seema falsely accuses Raja of rape, the family throws him out of the house.

Cast
 Shammi Kapoor as Raja / Moti (Double Role)
 Sadhana as Radhika
 Shashikala as Seema
 Helen as Kasturi
 Sulochana Latkar as Raja & Moti's Mother
 Jagdish Raj as Jaggu
 Asit Sen as Talwar
 Shammi as Gulabi
 Sunder as Radhika's Uncle

Soundtrack
Lyrics: Rajendra Krishan

External links

1970s Hindi-language films
1974 films
Films scored by Shankar–Jaikishan
Films directed by K. Shankar